Online Nation is an American reality TV series that premiered on The CW on September 23, 2007. Scouring the endless number of websites, blogs, and user-generated materials on the Internet, Online Nation featured everything and anything that has captured the attention of the online world. In addition, viewers were supposed to be able to communicate with each other live on the air. However, this function was never available, even though in the original promo for the show, it showed the capability. The show was produced by Room 403 Productions, Warner Horizon Television and Magic Molehill.

The show premiered on September 23 with what was then the lowest ratings in the network's history, which could be blamed on the program being in one of the network's worst time slots and the network's lax promotion of the series. Only 994,000 viewers caught the premiere of the show.

On October 17, 2007, The CW canceled Online Nation, making it the second show to be canceled in the 2007–2008 television season.

The comedic duo who hosted the show, Rhett and Link, responded quickly to the cancellation with an internet video. They have since used the program's existence for running gags and self-deprecation in their comedy and online video careers.

Some of the videos included in the show were Chocolate Rain, Fast Food Freestyle, Ode To Zac Braff, Mac Or Pc, Hardy Har Har, Saving Plastic Ryan, and Vaczilla.

Nielsen ratings

Weekly ratings

Seasonal ratings
Seasonal ratings based on average total viewers per episode of Online Nation on The CW:

References

External links
 

The CW original programming
2007 American television series debuts
2007 American television series endings